Mahforujak (also Romanized as Māhforūjak, Māhforujak, and Māhfrūjak) is a village in Esfivard-e Shurab Rural District, in the Central District of Sari County, Mazandaran Province, Iran. At the 2006 census, its population was 892, in 254 families.

References 

Populated places in Sari County